Şordəhnə (also, Shordekhna and Shordekhne) is a village and municipality in the Agdash Rayon of Azerbaijan. It has a population of 957.

References

See also
Birinci Şordəhnə
İkinci Şordəhnə

Populated places in Agdash District